Daniel Michael Ventrelle (born 1976) is an American businessman. Ventrelle is currently the Executive Vice President of Talent for WWE. Previously, he served as the interim president of the Las Vegas Raiders of the National Football League (NFL) from July 2021 until May 2022, and had previously served as the team's executive vice president and general counsel.

Early years
Ventrelle, a native of Chicago, Illinois, attended the University of Notre Dame and the University of Michigan Law School.

Professional career

Early career
Prior to joining the Raiders full-time, Ventrelle served as outside counsel to the club at Howard Rice Nemerovski Canady Falk & Rabkin in San Francisco, California.

Oakland / Las Vegas Raiders
In 2003, Ventrelle joined the then Oakland Raiders. He rose through the ranks and became an executive vice president and general counsel. Along with owner Mark Davis and then-Raiders president Marc Badain, Ventrelle played a key role in the Raiders' relocation to Las Vegas and the building of a new stadium.

On July 19, 2021, Ventrelle was named the interim president of the Las Vegas Raiders following the resignation of Marc Badain on the same day. 

Following the conclusion of the 2021 season, Ventrelle remained in the role of interim president. Ventrelle worked to embed the Raiders organization in the Las Vegas community, championing issues such as the Raiders’ vaccine verification project and bringing the high school state championship football games to Allegiant Stadium. In May 2022, the Raiders announced that Ventrelle was no longer with the organization.

WWE
On September 8, 2022, Ventrelle was appointed Executive Vice President of Talent for WWE.

References

1976 births
Living people
Businesspeople from Chicago
Las Vegas Raiders executives
National Football League team presidents
Oakland Raiders executives
Sportspeople from Chicago
University of Michigan Law School alumni
University of Notre Dame alumni
WWE executives